The Tibidabo Funicular is a funicular railway in the city of Barcelona, in Catalonia, Spain. The line connects Plaça del Doctor Andreu, the upper terminus of the Tramvia Blau, with the summit of Tibidabo, where there is an amusement park and a church, the Temple Expiatori del Sagrat Cor.

The funicular is one of three in Barcelona, the others being the Funicular de Vallvidrera and the Funicular de Montjuïc. After modernisation works the funicular recommenced operations with new trainsets nicknamed "La Cuca de llum" in June 2021 during a period of upgrade works from 2019.

The Tramvia Blau, along with a parallel bus service, provides a connection from Avinguda Tibidabo metro station. This is the terminus of line 7 of the Barcelona Metro, operated by the FGC from a city terminus at Plaça de Catalunya.

Like the Tramvia Blau, the funicular is not part of Autoritat del Transport Metropolità (ATM) integrated fare network. Tickets must be separately purchased from ticket offices or machines at the terminal stations prior to travel.

History 

It has been modernised in 1922, 1958 and most recently in 2021.

Technical details 
The funicular has the following technical parameters:

Rollingstock

2021 - present 
After overhaul works to infrastructure between 2019 and 2021, new cars began operating on completely replaced tracks featuring a wider gauge of 1,400mm.

There are two articulated vehicles currently operating with a capacity of 252 people and an empty vehicle weight of 30 tons.

1958 - 2019 
The most notable change was the replacement of wooden bodies replaced by metal ones.

1901 - 1958 
The vehicles had been remodelled multiple times over this period with cars made from wood. The first bodies were built by the Estrada de Sarriá workshops, and had five compartments divided between the preferential and general classes with a maximum capacity of 30 people.

References

External links
 
 Funicular del Tibidabo at trenscat.com

Tibidabo, Funicular del
Metre gauge railways in Spain